Dahemi is a village in Salarpur Tehsil, Budaun district, Uttar Pradesh, India.  Dahemi village is administrated by Sarpanch who is elected by people of a village. Hindi is the speaking languages in this village.

Dahemi is 8 kilometers away from Badaun City. The total geographical area of this village is 411.29 hectares. An ancient temple dedicated to Shiva is located in the village.

References

Villages in Budaun district